Hayden Murphy (born 1945) is an Irish editor, literary critic and poet. He was born in Dublin, and brought up there and in Limerick. He was educated at Blackrock College and Trinity College, Dublin.

During 1967-78 he edited, published, and personally distributed Broadsheet, which contained poetry and graphics.  In the mid-1970s, he contributed reviews of collections and recordings of poetry to the Scottish politics, current affairs, history and the arts review, Calgacus.

Selected works
Flames of History, illustrations by John Behan (1999)
Wedded Echoes (1995)
Exile's Journal: A Poem Sequence, with Hugh Bryden (Jun 1992)
Broadsheet: Poetry, Prose and Graphics: Exhibition Catalogue (1983)
Places Of Glass (1979)
Considering... (1977)
Broadsheet, No.19 (1972)
Poems (1967)

References

External links
 National Library of Scotland
https://norch.co.uk/hayden-murphy

Irish poets
Living people
1945 births
People educated at Blackrock College